Major General Nguyễn Văn Chuân was an officer of the Army of the Republic of Vietnam. He served as the commander of I Corps, which oversaw the northernmost part of the country, from 14 March 1966 until 9 April of the same year, when he was replaced by Lieutenant General Tôn Thất Đính.

During his tenure as I Corps Commander, the Buddhist Uprising started in the region because his predecessor Nguyễn Chánh Thi was very popular and was dismissed by military rival Nguyễn Cao Kỳ. Chuẩn supported the Struggle Movement against the junta in Saigon. Kỳ replaced Chuẩn with Đính in an attempt to shut down the opposition.

Notes

References

Army of the Republic of Vietnam generals
Possibly living people
Place of birth missing (living people)
Year of birth missing (living people)